Presto Foodmarkets was a chain of supermarkets and convenience stores in Great Britain, which first appeared in the early 1960s.  While the fate of most of the chain's stores was conversion to Safeway, the final stores still trading as Presto were either closed or sold in 1998.

History

Early years
The company was established in the north of England and in Scotland in the early 1960s where its primary base remained but for some years Presto did have a nationwide presence. According to the Institute of Grocery Distribution the name derives from the town of Prestonpans, the location in which the first Presto store was opened.  A store also opened around the same time in the Preston Grange Estate in Preston, Tyne and Wear.

Presto was a division of Allied Suppliers which also operated 500 Lipton supermarkets in England and Wales as well as the brands Galbraith and R & J Templeton with around 85 supermarkets in Scotland. Allied also operated a discount chain, Lo-Cost as well as Cordon Bleu, a chain of freezer centres. Presto was the most significant brand, operating primarily large supermarkets and superstores throughout the country. In 1979 it purchased the south east based chain Cater Brothers and incorporated them into the Presto brand.

Acquisition by Argyll Foods

In 1982, Presto and its 136 stores transferred, together with the rest of Allied Suppliers to Argyll Foods. Allied Suppliers was sold by its then owner James Goldsmith for £101 million.

The brand relaunch

In 1985, Argyll began a major re-organisation of its food store division. In Scotland and Northern England, the Hintons, Lipton, Galbraith and Templeton stores were either rebranded as Presto stores or closed. For some time, Hintons' direct marketing magazine "Going Shopping" continued with the Presto name including the headline "Presto - Our Heart's in the North". Liptons stores in the rest of England and Wales were either closed or converted to Presto (larger stores) or Lo-Cost (smaller stores). Argyll also launched a new slogan in 1985 moving from "for the best, best go to Presto" to "You'll be impressed in Presto".

To complement the new slogan, a new logo was also launched featuring yellow, blue and red as well as, for a short time, a shopping basket. The new logo was used on all converted stores while original Presto stores retained the old logo on their exterior signage throughout their life. A number of new Presto Superstores were also opened featuring the new logo. In 1986, the conversion programme was complete and Argyll was set for expansion and new Presto regional distribution centres in Bristol, Wakefield, Bathgate and Welwyn Garden City were planned.

Initial conversion to Safeway
In 1987, Argyll Foods purchased the UK operations of Safeway, which resulted in seven Presto stores (including Farnham, Morden and Chandlers Wharf, Stockton-on-Tees) being converted to Safeway on a trial basis. In 1988 a further 57 Presto stores (including the store at Sedgley, West Midlands, which had opened only a year earlier) had been converted to Safeway.

While most (but not all) of the Presto stores were converted to Safeway during this period, the smaller stores located in Scotland and the north of England continued to trade as Presto.

Revival of Presto
The first new Presto store to open since 1987 opened in Kirkwall (Orkney) in 1991. This was shortly followed by another new store in Lockerbie.

In March 1993, Argyll split its retail operations into two divisions, Safeway Stores, and Presto and Lo-Cost Stores.  Super Marketing reported that Sir Alistair Grant stated in a memo, "The creation of Presto and Lo-Cost divisions is an important move which signifies our commitment to these important businesses and our wish that their direction and management should be given a strong specific focus."

In 1993 Argyll also acquired four supermarkets from Norco in Scotland. Three of these stores were converted to Presto (in Banchory, Ellon, and Westhill) and one larger store (Elgin) was converted to Safeway.

More new stores opened over the next couple of years as well as replacements for existing Presto stores such as the new build Presto store at Springfield in Stokesley, North Yorkshire which replaced an older former Hintons location.

Disappearance
In 1994, 150 smaller Presto stores, including many former Lipton's branches, were sold to convenience operator, Spar.

In 1996 Argyll announced it was changing its name to Safeway and would be converting the remaining 110 Presto stores to Safeway.  While Presto branded products, and even carrier bags, were quickly replaced with Safeway, the conversion of the stores was not complete until mid-1998 when the final Presto (mainly smaller) stores which were not to be converted to Safeway were sold on to other retailers including Spar.

References

Retail companies established in 1964
Retail companies disestablished in 1998
Defunct supermarkets of the United Kingdom